Jayant Kripalani is an Indian film, television and stage actor, director and trainer. He is most known for his role in the TV series, like Khandaan, Mr. Mrs and Ji Mantriji (2003). He also wrote the screenplay for Shyam Benegal's film, Well Done Abba (2009). He was noted for his performance in The Hungry (2017) that is based on the adaptation of William Shakespeare's Titus Andronicus. He performed in Ji Mantri Ji, the well-known star plus comedy series in years 2000 to 2002.

Early life and education
He graduated from Jadavpur University with a degree in English literature.

Career
He has worked at JWT, Grant Kenyon & Eckhardt and as senior creative director with RK Swamy BBDO. He was one of the first small-screen stars in India featuring in the 1980s TV serials like Khandan, as well as an appearance in the horror anthology series Aahat as a vampire, Mr. Mrs and later in Ji Mantriji (2003), the Indian adaptation of BBC's satirical sitcom, Yes Minister. Jayant has played character roles in movies like Heat and Dust (1983) directed by James Ivory, Rockford, in the Indian sci-fi thriller Alag, in the 2008 blockbuster Jaane Tu... Ya Jaane Na and in 3 Idiots (2009) movie as interview panel head.

Jayant has directed and produced films for multinationals and is actively involved with theatre. Jayant has written the scripts for the original Ghar Jamai which was aired in the old TV days of Doordarshan. He has written and produced PC aur Mausi — a mini TV series which explored the prejudices a 'mausi' (maternal aunt) had with the advent of the 'dreaded' personal computer (PC) in the mid-1980s in India. Amongst his earlier work is an educational TV programme in which children explored the statement "Why is Water Wet!" in a successful format. He also acted as a quiz master in an infotainment channel's quiz show.

Filmography

Films
Arohan (1983), Senior District Magistrate
Heat and Dust (1983), Dr. Gopal
Party (1984)
Trikal (1985), Francis
Susman (1987)
Pehla Nasha (1993), Deepak's friend
Rockford (1999), Brother Lawrence
Chupke Se (2003), Mr. Arya
Alag (2006), Pushkar Rana
Jaane Tu... Ya Jaane Na (2008), Aditi's Father
Ru Ba Ru (2008), Dilip
Summer 2007 (2008), Principal
3 Idiots (2009), Interviewer
Hawaizaada (2015), father of Shivkar Bapuji Talpade
The Hungry (2017), Poddar
Taranath Tantrik (2019), Tantrik Taranath
Dawat-i-Biryani (2019)

Web series

References

External links
 
 Exper Executive Education

Living people
Indian male film actors
Male actors in Hindi cinema
Jadavpur University alumni
Indian male television actors
Indian advertising directors
Indian male stage actors
Year of birth missing (living people)